Somsara-ye Olya (also Romanized as Somsarā-ye ‘Olyā; also known as Somsarā Bālā and Somsarā-ye Bālā) is a village in Bala Jam Rural District, Nasrabad District, Torbat-e Jam County, Razavi Khorasan Province, Iran. At the 2006 census, its population was 119, in 31 families.

روستای شهید پرور سمسرا علیا

References 

Populated places in Torbat-e Jam County